Ẕāheṟ Khūnē is a small town in Afghanistan with a population of around 1,646.

See also
 Zabul Province

References

Populated places in Zabul Province